Pultenaea densifolia, commonly known as dense-leaved bush-pea, is a species of flowering plant in the family Fabaceae and is endemic to southern continental Australia. It is a spreading or low-lying shrub with broadly egg-shaped, down-curved leaves and clusters of purple or yellow, red and purple flowers.

Description
The standard is purple or yellow with red markings, and the wings and keel are purple. Flowering occurs from October to November and the fruit is an egg-shaped pod mostly enclosed by the remains of the sepals.

Taxonomy and naming
Pultenaea densifolia was first formally described in 1855 by Ferdinand von Mueller in Definitions of rare or hitherto undescribed Australian plants. The specific epithet (densifolia) means "crowded-leaved".

Distribution and habitat
This pultenaea grows in mallee in south-eastern South Australia and in north-western Victoria where it is uncommon.

References

densifolia
Fabales of Australia
Flora of South Australia
Flora of Victoria (Australia)
Taxa named by Ferdinand von Mueller
Plants described in 1855